Baxter Village is a planned community and census-designated place (CDP) in York County, South Carolina, United States. It was first listed as a CDP prior to the 2020 census which showed a population of 4,217.

The CDP is in northeastern York County. It is bordered to the east by the city of Fort Mill, to the west by Tega Cay, and to the south by unincorporated Riverview. South Carolina Highway 160 forms the northeast border of the CDP; the highway leads southeast into Fort Mill and northwest  into the western outskirts of Charlotte, North Carolina. Interstate 77 runs along the east side of Baxter Village, with access via Exit 85 to SC 160. I-77 leads north  to the center of Charlotte and south  to Columbia.

Demographics

2020 census

Note: the US Census treats Hispanic/Latino as an ethnic category. This table excludes Latinos from the racial categories and assigns them to a separate category. Hispanics/Latinos can be of any race.

References 

Census-designated places in York County, South Carolina
Census-designated places in South Carolina